Tyler Boucher (born January 16, 2003) is an American professional ice hockey right winger for the Ottawa 67's of the Ontario Hockey League (OHL) as a prospect to the Ottawa Senators of the National Hockey League (NHL). Boucher was drafted in the first round, tenth overall, by the Senators in the 2021 NHL Entry Draft.  His father, Brian Boucher, is a former NHL goaltender.

Playing career
After beginning the 2021–22 season with the Boston University Terriers of the Hockey East, collecting just 2 goals and 3 points through 17 games, Boucher opted to conclude his collegiate career and was signed a three-year, entry-level contract with the Ottawa Senators on December 28, 2021. Thus ineligible to continue with Boston, Boucher joined the Ottawa 67's major junior team to continue his development. He was originally drafted by the 67's in the 2019 OHL Priority Selection 143rd overall.

International play

On December 12, 2022, Boucher was named to the United States men's national junior ice hockey team to compete at the 2023 World Junior Ice Hockey Championships. During the tournament he recorded three goals and one assist in six games and won a bronze medal.

Career statistics

Regular season and playoffs

International

References

External links
 

2003 births
Living people
American ice hockey left wingers
Boston University Terriers men's ice hockey players
National Hockey League first-round draft picks
Ottawa 67's players
Ottawa Senators draft picks
Sportspeople from Scarborough, Toronto
Ice hockey people from Toronto
American expatriate ice hockey players in Canada